The bicolored conebill (Conirostrum bicolor) is a small passerine bird. This member of the tanager family is a resident breeder in South America from Colombia, Venezuela and Trinidad south and east to the Guianas, northeast  Peru and Brazil.

Habitat
Its habitat is coastal mangrove swamps and neighbouring woodlands. The small feather-lined cup nest is built in a mangrove tree, and the normal clutch is two brown-blotched buff eggs. Nests are often parasitised by shiny cowbirds.

Description
The bicolored conebill is 11.4 cm long and weighs 11 g. The adult is grey-blue above and buff-tinged grey below, with red eyes, pink legs and a sharp, pointed bill. The primary flight feathers are bluish with brown edgings. The sexes are similar, although the female may be a little duller, but immature birds are greenish above and have pale yellow underparts. Birds sometimes breed in immature plumage.

Diet
These warbler-like birds eat mainly insects and occasionally seeds. The bicolored conebill's call is a thin tseep.

References 

bicolored conebill
Birds of Venezuela
Birds of the Guianas
Birds of Trinidad and Tobago
Birds of the Amazon Basin
Birds of Brazil
Birds of the Atlantic Forest
bicolored conebill
bicolored conebill